Pentachlaena orientalis is a tree in the family Sarcolaenaceae. It is endemic to Madagascar.

Description

Distribution and habitat
Pentachlaena orientalis is known from the eastern regions of Alaotra-Mangoro, Analanjirofo and Atsinanana. Its habitat is humid forest from sea level to about  altitude. Some subpopulations of the species occur in protected areas.

References

Sarcolaenaceae
Endemic flora of Madagascar
Trees of Madagascar
Plants described in 1973
Taxa named by René Paul Raymond Capuron